Orphulella pelidna, the spotted-winged grasshopper, is a species of slant-faced grasshopper in the family Acrididae. It is found in the Caribbean Sea, Central America, North America, and the Caribbean.

References

Further reading

External links

 

pelidna
Articles created by Qbugbot
Insects described in 1838